The third season of Dexter premiered on September 28, 2008, and ended on December 14, 2008. "Our Father", the season premiere, attracted 1.22 million viewers in the United States, making it Showtime's highest-rated drama season premiere since Nielsen Media Research began compiling ratings in 2004. The season finale "Do You Take Dexter Morgan?" attracted 1.5 million viewers. Season three was watched by an average of 1.1 million viewers a week.

In this season, Dexter kills a man in self-defense and initiates a friendship with the man's brother, Assistant District Attorney Miguel Prado (Jimmy Smits). In the meantime, Rita discovers that she is pregnant, and Debra investigates the murders of a new serial killer called "The Skinner", hoping to gain a promotion to detective. In addition to Smits, Dexter third season introduces two recurring characters: Desmond Harrington as Det. Joey Quinn, who becomes Debra's partner when he is transferred from the narcotics department to homicide, and Anne Ramsay as Ellen Wolf, a defense attorney whom Miguel detests.

It received largely positive reviews from critics, which ranged from being praised as "truly and incredibly exciting television" in the San Francisco Chronicle, to "lack[ing] the crackling tension the drama had supplied in previous years" by the Chicago Tribune; the aggregate site Metacritic scored the season at 78 out of 100 based on 13 reviews. Smits and Hall received Emmy nominations for their roles as Miguel Prado and Dexter Morgan respectively, while the show as a whole also received a Best Drama Emmy nomination.

Plot 
Rita discovers she is pregnant, informing Dexter that she will keep the baby and raise him with or without his help. He ends up proposing marriage to Rita, which she eventually accepts.

While stalking a murderous drug dealer, "Freebo", Dexter stumbles upon a fight between Freebo and another man, whom he is forced to kill in self-defense. This is the first time Dexter kills someone of whose guilt he wasn't completely sure. This victim turns out to be Oscar Prado, brother of Miguel Prado (Jimmy Smits), a prominent assistant district attorney and old flame of Lt. LaGuerta. Miguel comes to confide in and trust Dexter after he helps assist with the case. Dexter tracks down Freebo and kills him, but as he leaves he encounters Miguel, who has followed a lead to Freebo's location. Dexter tells Miguel he had discovered Freebo and killed him in self-defense, but instead of reprimanding him, Miguel thanks him and offers to help him cover up the crime. As Dexter and Miguel cooperate to conceal Freebo's true demise from everyone else, the duo end up becoming close friends, as do Rita and Miguel's wife, Sylvia.

Miguel feeds Dexter information regarding a killer who continually gets away with it, in hopes Dexter will once again take matters into his own hands. When he discovers that Dexter indeed took such action, he realizes what Dexter was doing and encourages him. Miguel hopes they can form a partnership and wants to be more hands-on in the future, with the guidance of Dexter. Trying to discourage Miguel, Dexter proposes a risky operation to free an infamous Aryan Brotherhood leader from prison in order to kill him. Miguel agrees with the idea and the plan succeeds. Dexter starts to recognize Miguel as his first and only true friend, to the point of inviting him to be his best man at his wedding.

Debra starts working more seriously to earn her detective shield, and also starts working with a new partner, Joey Quinn. They investigate a serial killer, "The Skinner", who skins his victims alive. She also starts a relationship with Anton Briggs, one of Quinn's confidential informants.

Miguel and Dexter's partnership takes a new step when Miguel offers to be the one to kill their next target. With some reluctance, Dexter agrees, only watching as Miguel kills without hesitation. The next day, Ellen Wolf, a ruthless defense attorney and old courtroom adversary of Miguel's, goes missing, and Dexter discovers that Miguel has killed her alone. Dexter also learns that Miguel has been manipulating him since the beginning.

Dexter and Miguel both try to gain leverage over the other, with Dexter leaving Wolf's body to be discovered and investigated, while Miguel starts an investigation into Anton (the key witness to identifying the Skinner) and Deb's relationship. Dexter eventually realizes that Miguel cannot be allowed to run loose any longer, at which point Dexter decides to kill him and make it look like The Skinner did it. Meanwhile, Miguel uses his position to help The Skinner escape police custody in return for his agreeing to kill Dexter. Striving to discover the truth about Wolf's death, LaGuerta ends up obtaining evidence which links Miguel to the crime. Miguel discovers that LaGuerta was investigating him and decides to kill her, but Dexter discovers Miguel's plot and captures him. Before killing Miguel, Dexter confesses to him that he was the one who killed Oscar.

After Miguel's body is discovered, he is immediately identified as a victim of The Skinner, just as Dexter planned. Miguel's other brother, Ramon, however, becomes suspicious of Dexter. After pointing a gun at Dexter during a dinner with Rita, he is taken into custody. During a visit to him in jail, Dexter helps Ramon put his demons to rest.

On the night before his wedding, Dexter is captured by The Skinner, but breaks free by taking advantage of a moment when the Skinner is distracted, shattering his hand in the process. After a short but vicious fight, Dexter snaps The Skinner's neck and makes it look like suicide by dumping his body in front of a moving police car. Dexter gets his broken hand put in a cast and attends his wedding.

Cast

Main cast 
 Michael C. Hall as Dexter Morgan
 Julie Benz as Rita Bennett
 Jennifer Carpenter as Debra Morgan
 C.S. Lee as Vince Masuka
 Lauren Vélez as María LaGuerta
 David Zayas as Angel Batista
 James Remar as Harry Morgan

Special Guest Star 
 Jimmy Smits as Miguel Prado

Recurring cast 
 Desmond Harrington as Joey Quinn
 David Ramsey as Anton Briggs
 Valerie Cruz as Sylvia Prado
 Kristin Dattilo as Barbara Gianna
 Jason Manuel Olazabal as Ramon Prado
 Christina Robinson as Astor Bennett
 Preston Bailey as Cody Bennett
 Jesse Borrego as Jorge Orozco/George King
 Anne Ramsay as Ellen Wolf
 Liza Lapira as Yuki Amado
 Sage Kirkpatrick as Laura Moser
 Margo Martindale as Camilla Figg
 Tasia Sherel as Francis

Guest cast 
Marc John Jefferies as Wendell Owens
Jane McLean as Tammy Okama 
 Vincent Pagano as Toby Edwards 
Jerry Zatarain as Mario Estorga 
 Mike Erwin as Fred "Freebo" Bowman 
Nick Hermz as Oscar Prado 
 Ray Santiago as Javier Garza 
Jelly Howie as Teegan Campbell
 Larry Sullivan as Ethan Turner
 Blake Gibbons as Clemson Galt
 Jeff Chase as Billy Fleeter

Crew 

Longstanding executive producers John Goldwyn, Sara Colleton and Clyde Phillips all returned for the third season. They were joined by new executive producer Charles H. Eglee. Eglee was accompanied by consulting producer Adam E. Fierro, the two had previously worked together on The Shield. Second season co-executive producers Scott Buck and Melissa Rosenberg retained their roles. Series star Michael C. Hall also became a co-executive producer for the third season. Executive Story Editor Timothy Schlattmann and Story Editor Lauren Gussis were promoted to the production team as producer and co-producer respectively. Robert Lloyd Lewis returned as the on set producer. Gary Law joined the production team as a co-producer mid-season. Chad Tomasoski remained an associate producer.

Episodes

References

External links 

 
 

 
2008 American television seasons